The Women's shot put F12 event for visually impaired athletes was held at the 2004 Summer Paralympics in the Athens Olympic Stadium on 23 September. It was won by Tamara Sivakova, representing .

25 Sept. 2004, 09:30

References

W
2004 in women's athletics